The Battle of Atbara also known as the Battle of the Atbara River took place during the Second Sudan War. Anglo-Egyptian forces defeated 15,000 Sudanese rebels, called Mahdists or Dervishes, on the banks of the River Atbara. The battle proved to be the turning point in the conquest of Sudan by a British and Egyptian coalition.

By 1898, the combined British and Egyptian army was advancing down the Nile river into Sudan. The Sudanese Mahdist leader, the Khalifa Abdallahi ibn Muhammad ordered the Emir Mahmud Ahmad and his 10,000 strong army of western Sudan northward towards the junction of the Nile and River Atbara rivers to engage the British and Egyptian army led by Herbert Kitchener.

Encamping on the banks of the Atbara river by March 20, Mahmud, with Osman Digna's group of Dervish warriors were within  of the British camp outpost at Fort Atbara at the confluence of the Atbara with the Nile. On April 4, after seeing that the Mahdists were unwilling to attack, Kitchener quietly advanced with the British and Egyptian army towards the Mahdist fortified camp just outside the town of Nakheila.

The Anglo-Egyptian attack began at 06:20 on 8 April 1898. Three brigades, the British Brigade led by William Gatacre, and two Brigades of the Egyptian Division led by Archibald Hunter, led the attack. After a brief artillery bombardment of the Mahdist camp, the combined British and Egyptian brigades attacked. Soon, the British and Egyptian troops were in the Mahdist camp, often fighting hand-to-hand with the Mahdist warriors. After 45 minutes, the battle was over as Osman Digna led a few thousand warriors on a retreat to the south, while most of the remainder were killed or captured, including Mahmud who was captured by loyal Sudanese troops of the Egyptian Brigade.

The battle was celebrated by the Scottish poet William McGonagall.

References

Other sources

External link

Battle of Atbara
1898 in Sudan
Battles of the Mahdist War
Battles involving Egypt
Battles involving the United Kingdom
Conflicts in 1898
April 1898 events